Botanical Garden Station, is a station of Line 6 on the Guangzhou Metro. The station is located near South China National Botanical Garden, and it began operations on 28 June 2017, six months after the opening date of Line 6 east extension.

Station layout

Exits
There are six exits in the station, located on both sides of Tianyuan Road.

External links

Railway stations in China opened in 2017
Guangzhou Metro stations in Tianhe District